Chestervale is an unincorporated community in Logan County in Central Illinois. It is approximately 3.2 miles southeast of Lincoln, along Illinois Route 121. The community consists of a grain elevator, a county highway shed and a few homes.  It is on the Canadian National Railway.

References

External links
 Chestervale, IL @ Google maps (Zoom in to see town listed.)

Unincorporated communities in Logan County, Illinois
Unincorporated communities in Illinois